The Angel in the Clock (Spanish: El ángel en el reloj) is a 2017 Mexican animated adventure fantasy film directed by Miguel Ángel Uriegas and written by Uriegas, Rosana Curiel, and Miguel Bonilla. It was produced by the Fotosíntesis Media Studio, the studio's first film.

Synopsis 
Set in contemporary Mexico, the film presents Amelia as a happy and mischievous little girl. Her wish is to be able to stop time, because she has been diagnosed with leukemia.

In the quest to reach her goal, Amelia meets Malachi, an angel who lives inside her cuckoo clock. Malachi takes Amelia through the Fields of Time. Amelia is accompanied by the fairies 'Here' and 'Now.' Amelia accidentally breaks the angel clock, severely damaging her time. Amelia then seeks the help of master watchmaker Balzac the bear. Through her adventure, Amelia is deceived by Captain Manecilla and faces the terrible villain named 'No time.' Through great sacrifices, Amelia finally discovers the value of living in the present.

Cast 

 Zoe Mora as Amelia

 Camila Sodi as Martina
 Erick Elías as Alejandro, Amelia's father
 Laura Flores as Ana, Amelia's mother
 Leonardo de Lozanne as Malaki
 Mario Arvizu as Balzac

Production 
Development began in 2017, with a budget of $2 million. The film was created to help children with cancer.

Release 
The Angel in the Clock premiered in theaters in Mexico on May 25, 2018.

Reception
Proceso Fausto Ponce and 20 minutos Paula Arantzazu Ruiz commended on the film's positive message about the importance of living in the moment. However, Ponce noted that the script was a bit complicated, and the animation quality was not up to par with that of Hollywood films.

References

External links 

 

2018 films
2018 animated films
2018 fantasy films
Mexican animated films
Mexican fantasy adventure films
2010s Spanish-language films
2010s Mexican films
Films about cancer
Films about time
Films about fairies and sprites